The 2022 Seoul Open Challenger was a professional tennis tournament played on outdoor hard courts. It was the sixth edition of the tournament. It was part of the 2022 ATP Challenger Tour. It took place in Seoul, South Korea, between 10 and 16 October 2022.

Singles main draw entrants

Seeds 

 1 Rankings as of 3 October 2022.

Other entrants 
The following players received wildcards into the singles main draw:
  Chung Hong
  Kim Cheong-eui
  Kim Jang-jun

The following player received entry into the singles main draw using a protected ranking:
  Marc Polmans

The following players received entry from the qualifying draw:
  Aleksandar Kovacevic
  Shintaro Mochizuki
  Hiroki Moriya
  Naoki Nakagawa
  Maximilian Neuchrist
  Li Tu

Champions

Singles

 Li Tu def.  Wu Yibing 7–6(7–5), 6–4.

Doubles

 Kaichi Uchida /  Wu Tung-lin def.  Chung Yun-seong /  Aleksandar Kovacevic 6–7(2–7), 7–5, [11–9].

References

Seoul Open Challenger
2022
2022 in South Korean sport
October 2022 sports events in South Korea